On 6 October 1998, Prime Minister of Pakistan Nawaz Sharif relieved the Chairman of the Joint Chiefs of Staff Committee and the Chief of Army Staff of Pakistan, General Jehangir Karamat, from the command of the Pakistan Armed Forces for making public statements regarding and contradicting the policies of public administration. At a public and political science circles, General Karamat had a popular support and occupied a prestigious image in the country for his role to promote democratic process in the country. His dismissal remains a controversial topic in the field of civil-military relations, and the move remains still questionable at the political science circles of Pakistan.

A war veteran of Indo-Pakistani wars and former professor of political science at the National Defence University (NDU), General Karamat was an apolitical and professional military leader, but confrontation involving the Fourteenth Amendment and matters of principle of civilian control of the military was ingrained, which eventually led the relieving of General Jehangir Karamat from his command of the military by Prime Minister Nawaz Sharif in October 1998.

Background

Nawaz Sharif

As scheduled, the general elections were held on 3 February 1997, which marked the return of Nawaz Sharif with an exclusive, two-thirds majority in the Parliament. Just after days of re-electing for his second term, Prime Minister Sharif faced serious constitutional crises with the Supreme Court and the Presidency on the other side. Nawaz Sharif made very important Constitutional Amendments that inserted in the Constitution which introduced termination of the Eighth Amendment and passing of the Thirteenth Amendment, with the enaction of the anti-corruption bill in 1997.

Sharif's constitutional moves were challenged by the Chief Justice Sajjad Ali Shah and President Farooq Leghari; both were forced to resign by Nawaz Sharif on 2 December 1997. After Sharif ordering the nuclear tests in 1998 and his unsuccessful attempt to pass the Fifteenth Amendment, a number of military officers publicly disagreed with the administration's policy over administration. This confrontation led to the resignation of General Jehangir Karamat on 7 October 1998. General Karamat was replaced by General Pervez Musharraf.

Jehangir Karamat
In stature and seniority, General Karamat was a foremost army generals in the Pakistan Military. A son of civil servant and a highly decorated war veteran of Indo-Pakistani wars, Karamat was an academic who graduated with a top of his PMA Kakul class of 1961 and later fully tenured as professor of political science at the National Defence University (NDU) during most of the 1970s and 1980s.

Karamat was a recipient of Pakistan's highest military and civilian honours as well as occupied a good image in country's public circles. He had a distinguish combat career, and many of his students at NDU would ascended in prestigious combat assignments in the country's military science circles. In 1995, Karamat gained national publicity after thwarting the conspiracy against Prime minister Benazir Bhutto, and his credentials would lead to him to be appointed simultaneously to four-star assignments, Chief of Army Staff and Chairman Joint Chiefs of Staff Committee by Benazir Bhutto.

Events leading up to the relief

Problems with Supreme Court and Presidency

The conservative mass led by Prime Minister Nawaz Sharif had come to the power with a two-majority as a result of 1997 general elections. Sharif established the Anti Terrorism Courts (ATC), Anti-Corruption Bill and passed the Fourteenth Amendment to the constitution, all in 1997. After criticising the Chief Justice, the supreme court summoned Nawaz Sharif of Contempt of court and appeared in supreme court with party workers, members, chief ministers, and constituents to hear the proceedings. Unruly party workers stormed into the Supreme Court, forcing Chief Justice Sajjad Ali Shah to remove the finding of contempt against Prime minister Sharif. Hundreds of PML-N supporters and members of its youth wing, the Muslim Students Front (MSF), breached the police barrier around the courthouse when defence lawyer S.M. Zafar was arguing Sharif's case. The partisans invaded the supreme court premises and intimated the senior judges at the supreme court; all of this actions were recorded in security cameras and television channels broadcast the event nationwide.

Chief Justice Shah wrote a letter to President Farooq Leghari to call for armed forces actions against Sharif. However, the constant pressure of Farooq Leghari deteriorated his health and resigned from the presidency. Chief Justice Shah's tenured was cut short when Sharif appointed Justice Saeeduzzaman Siddiqui in his place, and his appointment was approved by the new president; Shah also resigned from the supreme court after hearing the news on television channels.

Public statements and relief

After ordering the nuclear tests in 1998, Prime minister Sharif chaired the Defence Committee of the Cabinet (DCC) session with the chairman and chiefs of armed forces to overview the situation with India. Although both Nawaz Sharif and general Jehangir Karamat were educated and hold common beliefs concerning the national security, but problems arose with chairman joint chiefs and chief of army staff general Karamat in October 1998.

While addressing the naval officers and cadets at the Naval War College, general Karamat stressed the re-creation of National Security Council (instead of DCC) which would be backed by a "team of civil-military experts" for devising policies to seek resolution ongoing problems relating the civil-military issues; also recommended a "neutral but competent bureaucracy and administration of at federal level and the establishment of Local governments in four provinces.

This proposal was met with hostility, and it succeeded all in accomplishing was pricking the Prime minister's highly inflated altered ego. Nawaz Sharif's dismissal of general Karamat, plummeted his mandate in the public circles and criticism he received from Leader of the Opposition Benazir Bhutto was rogue.

Sharif summoned the chairman joint chiefs and notified him of his relieving from the service. On 6 October 1998, Nawaz Sharif dismissed and signed the relieving papers which went on effect immediately. Many in Pakistan became surprised of Sharif's moved since the dismissal of four-star general was never happened before in country's short history.

Aftermath

Response and fallout
With Karamat's dismissal, it was widely felt in the armed forces that Sharif had ruthlessly established his control all over the country, including the military. The dismissal of General Karamat was least popular decision in Sharif's prime ministerial ship, and his approval ratings plummeted. Media Minister Syed Mushahid Hussain and later Prime minister himself justified his actions on national and international media:

The relieve of General Karamat was a heated issue discussed even by his senior government ministers. The most-senior and the former Treasury minister Sartaj Aziz gave vehement criticism and showed opposition to the Prime minister for making this move.

Writing a thesis in his book, Between Dreams and Realities: Some Milestones in Pakistan's History, Aziz maintained: "Blunder of firing of General Karamatt; others will blame Nawaz Sharif for many mistakes he made. But in my view, the most serious of these mistakes was Nawaz Sharif's decision to remove General Jehangir Karamat as chief of army staff in October 1998". Aziz was extremely confident and certain that Chief of General Staff Lieutenant-General Ali Kuli Khan would be appointed as the Chief of Army Staff based on his seniority, merit, among a very competent officer, and next in seniority to General Karamat.

In 1999, Nawaz Sharif later dismissed Chief of Naval Staff Admiral Fasih Bokhari to promote General Musharraf to chairman joint chiefs. The following month, a failed attempt to dismiss Musharraf led to a military coup d'état against Prime minister Nawaz Sharif in 1999.

Citations and references

Readings and books
 
 

Civil–military relations
Nawaz Sharif administration
1998 in Pakistan
Karamat, Jehangir